Titanic is a 1996 American two-part television miniseries which premiered on CBS on November 17 and 19, 1996. It focuses on several characters aboard the RMS Titanic during her maiden voyage in 1912. The miniseries was directed by Robert Lieberman. The original music score was composed by Lennie Niehaus.

Plot
Titanic follows three main story threads.

Isabella Paradine is traveling on the Titanic to join her husband after attending her aunt's funeral in the United Kingdom. On the Titanic, she meets Wynn Park, her former lover. She falls in love with him again, and after a brief affair, she sends her husband a wireless saying they cannot be together anymore (despite their daughter). When the ship starts sinking, Isabella reluctantly leaves Wynn when he forces her to board a lifeboat. As the boat is lowered, Isabella confesses a long kept secret that her daughter Claire is actually Wynn's. Later on board the RMS Carpathia she is grief-stricken when she finds Wynn's lifeless body on deck, having died of hypothermia, but luckily, when the Carpathia reaches New York City she is reunited with her family who are blissfully unaware of Isabella's tryst because the telegram was never sent out due to the sinking.

Also in first class is the Allison family, a family travelling on the Titanic, returning home to Montreal with their two small children and new nurse, Alice Cleaver. They gradually become wary and suspicious of her hysterical and neurotic behavior. Later on, a fellow maid asks her if she'd seen her in Cairo the previous month, but soon realizes that she remembers her from the highly publicized trial where Alice was accused of throwing her baby off a train. When the Titanic starts sinking, Alice Cleaver panics and quickly boards a lifeboat with Trevor, the Allisons' infant son. The parents with their small daughter are unaware that the baby is safe and refuse to leave the ship without him, which in the end costs them their lives.

In third class, a young vagrant named Jamie Perse steals a ticket to get on board. He manages to become friends with one of the crewmen, Simon Doonan, who is also a robber, but later is revealed to be a much more violent and callous criminal than Jamie. The young man falls in love with Aase (pronounced "Osa") Ludvigsen, a recent Christian convert and missionary. On the night of the sinking, Aase is brutally raped and beaten by Doonan, causing her to lose her faith and will to live, but Jamie manages to get her into Isabella's boat. Unbeknownst to them, Doonan also sneaks aboard that same boat, disguised as an old woman. After the ship sinks, Aase is knocked off the lifeboat by Doonan after she recognizes him, and he attempts to hold the passengers in the boat hostage at gunpoint, but Officer Lowe, who is in charge of the boat, hits Doonan in the head with an oar, snapping his neck and killing him. Jamie himself manages to survive when he accidentally falls into one of the last lifeboats before the Titanic sinks. He subsequently atones for his past life after he finds Aase in the makeshift hospital aboard the Carpathia. In the end, upon arriving in New York City, the two plan to start a new life together.

Cast

Reception
The New York Daily News commented on the fact that the acting was substandard and the ship's operators and owner are portrayed "about as sympathetically as those connected with the Exxon Valdez." The Seattle Post-Intelligencer also referenced the "embarrassingly bad acting" and out of place scenes.

Awards

Titanic received an Emmy Award for Outstanding Sound Mixing for a Drama Miniseries or a Special. It was also nominated for Outstanding Costume Design for a Miniseries or a Special.

References

External links
 
 

1996 television films
1996 films
CBS network films
American disaster films
American romantic drama films
1990s American television miniseries
American Zoetrope films
Canadian drama films
English-language Canadian films
Sonar Entertainment miniseries
Seafaring films based on actual events
Television series set in the 1910s
Films about RMS Titanic
Television series about RMS Titanic
Romantic period films
Films set in 1912
1990s English-language films
Fictional works set in the Atlantic Ocean
Films directed by Robert Lieberman
Films about rape
1990s American films
1990s Canadian films